Chris Horton (born June 29, 1994) is an American professional basketball player for Lokomotiv Kuban of the VTB United League. He played college basketball at Austin Peay.

College career
Horton was a four-year starter for the Austin Peay Governors. During his freshman season, Horton set a school record for blocks in a season with 100 and finished sixth in Division I with 3.23 blocks per game to go with 8.2 points and 6.8 rebounds per game this season and was named the Ohio Valley Conference (OVC) Freshman of the Year and to the conference All-Newcomer team. As a senior, he averaged 18.8 points, 12.0 rebounds and 1.75 blocks per game and 25 double-doubles and was named first team All-OVC. Horton was named the MVP of the 2016 OVC tournament after scoring 90 points and grabbing 57 rebounds during eighth-seeded Governors' run to the conference title. Horton finished his collegiate career as the fifth-leading scorer in school history with 1,719 points, the second-leading rebounder with 1,261 and the all-time leader with 319 shots blocked (2nd most in OVC history).

Professional career

Grand Rapids Drive
After going unselected in the 2016 NBA Draft, Horton was named to the Miami Heat's Summer League roster. Following his performance in Summer League, Horton was selected 5th overall in the 2016 NBA Development League draft by the Grand Rapids Drive. Horton averaged 6.2 points, 5.5 rebounds and 0.9 blocks per game in 49 games (11 starts) for the Drive in his rookie season. The Drive traded his overseas rights to the Delaware Blue Coats on January 22, 2019.

Alba Fehérvár
Horton signed with Alba Fehérvár of the Hungarian Nemzeti Bajnokság I/A (NB I/A) on August 3, 2017. Horton averaged  8.8 points, 6.6 rebounds and 1.3 blocks per game in 39 NB I/A games and  9.6 points, 6.9 rebounds and 1.8 blocks in 12 FIBA Europe Cup games with Alba.

Kymi
Horton signed with Kymi of the Greek Basket League (GBL) on July 30, 2018. Horton was named the GBL Player of the Week after scoring 24 points and grabbing 15 rebounds against PAOK on November 10, 2018. Horton finished the regular season as the league leader with 9.1 rebounds and 1.7 steals per game, fifth in the league with 13.6 points per game, and third with 1.6 blocks in 23 total games (16 starts) and was named honorable mention All-GBL by EuroBasket.com.

Cholet
Horton signed with Cholet Basket of the French LNB Pro A on July 15, 2019. Horton was selected to play for the "World" team in the 2020 LNB All-Star Game. Horton averaged 17 points, nine rebounds and 1.7 assists for Cholet.

BCM Gravelines-Dunkerque
On June 13, 2020, he signed with BCM Gravelines-Dunkerque of the LNB Pro A.

Cholet Basket
On January 2, 2021, he signed with Cholet Basket of the LNB Pro A.

Nanterre 92
On July 22, 2021, Horton signed with Nanterre 92. On May 18, 2022, Horton was named to the All-LNB Pro A First Team of the 2021–22 season.

Hapoel Tel Aviv
On July 28, 2022, he signed with Hapoel Tel Aviv of the Israeli Basketball Premier League.

Lokomotiv Kuban
On November 29, 2022, he signed with Lokomotiv Kuban of the VTB United League.

References

External links
Austin Peay State Governors bio
College Statistics at Sports-Reference.com
RealGM Profile
EuroBasket Profile

1994 births
Living people
Alba Fehérvár players
American expatriate basketball people in France
American expatriate basketball people in Greece
American expatriate basketball people in Hungary
American men's basketball players
Austin Peay Governors men's basketball players
Basketball players from Georgia (U.S. state)
Centers (basketball)
Cholet Basket players
Grand Rapids Drive players
Hapoel Tel Aviv B.C. players
Kymis B.C. players
Nanterre 92 players
PBC Lokomotiv-Kuban players
People from Decatur, Georgia
Power forwards (basketball)
Sportspeople from DeKalb County, Georgia